The Chunhyŏk Line is a railway line of the Korean State Railway in Kaech'ŏn city, South P'yŏngan Province, North Korea, running from Kaech'ŏn at the junction of the Kaech'ŏn and Manp'o Lines to Chunhyŏngri.

Route 

A yellow background in the "Distance" box indicates that section of the line is not electrified.

References

Railway lines in North Korea
Standard gauge railways in North Korea